Geistsee is a lake at Längenbühl in the Canton of Berne, Switzerland. The lake is private property and not accessible by the public.

References

Lakes of Switzerland
Lakes of the canton of Bern
LGeistsee